The Air Force Academy (AFA) is the Sri Lanka Air Force's training and education academy which provides initial training to all SLAF personnel who are preparing to be commissioned officers. AFA also provides initial training to Officer Cadets of the general duties pilot branch. The Air Force Academy is based at SLAF China Bay in Trincomalee. The Commandant of the academy is an officer of the rank of Air Commodore.

The academy offers a two-year program of basic flight training and a variety of specialized courses. Flight training is carried out by the 1 Flying Training Wing which is attached to the academy.

History
When the Royal Ceylon Air Force was formed in 1951, the No 1 Flight was formed with de Havilland DHC-1 Chipmunks to train RCyAF pilots on 1 September 1951 at RAF Negombo. In 1963 the Flying Training School was shifted to SLAF China Bay and was absorbed into the Air Force Academy when it was established in 1976 as the No. 1 Flying Training Wing. The Flying Training Wing shifted to SLAF Anuradhapura in 1988 with the escalation of the Sri Lankan Civil War and shifted back in 2009 at the end of the war.

Organization
The Air Force Academy is made up of four units;

 No. 1 Flying Training Wing
 Ground Training Wing
 Junior Command & Staff College
 NCO Management School
 No 06 Air Defence Radar Squadron

Degrees conducted by the AFA 
These degrees are accredited to the University of Kelaniya;

Bachelor of Science in Aeronautics

See also
General Sir John Kotelawala Defence University
Sri Lanka Military Academy
Naval and Maritime Academy

External links and sources
Sri Lanka Air Force

Specific

Sri Lanka Air Force
Military academies of Sri Lanka
Air force academies
Military education and training in Sri Lanka
Educational institutions established in 1976
Education in Eastern Province, Sri Lanka
1976 establishments in Sri Lanka